The Chinese middle schools riots were a series of riots that broke out in the Chinese Singaporean community in 1956, resulting in 13 people killed and more than 120 injured.

Overview
In 1956, after Lim Yew Hock replaced David Marshall as Chief Minister of Singapore, he began to take tough measures to suppress communist activities with the support of the British Governor and Commissioner of Police.

In September, Lim deregistered and banned two pro-communist organizations: the Singapore Women’s Association (SWA) and the Chinese Musical Gong Society. The Singapore Chinese Middle School Students Union (SCMSSU) was also dissolved.

The riots came about when Lim Yew Hock announced that the Singapore Chinese Middle School Students' Union would be closed due to its communist activities. The government also arrested four student leaders and expelled 142 students.

In protest, students gathered and camped at Chung Cheng High School and The Chinese High School. They sat-in over the next two weeks, organizing meetings and holding demonstrations. On 24 October, the government issued an ultimatum that the schools be vacated. As the deadline approached, riots started at the Chinese High School and spread to other parts of the island.

The government decided to take action. On 26 October 1956, the police entered the schools and cleared the students using tear gas. Forced out from the schools, the students headed for the city. They overturned cars and damaged traffic lights, and also threw stones and bottles. Over the next five days, 13 people were killed and more than 100 were injured.

See also
 List of riots in Singapore

References

External links
 "Singapore - People's Action Party" Country Data
 1956 Riots (Archived) Our Story Asia

1956 riots
Chinese diaspora in Singapore
Riots and civil disorder in Singapore
History of Singapore
Student protests in Singapore
1956 in Singapore